Francesco Orlando (born 30 November 1995) is an Italian professional footballer who plays as a winger for  club Siena, on loan from Salernitana.

Club career
Orlando made his professional debut in the Lega Pro for Maceratese on 6 September 2015, coming on as an 84th-minute substitute in a 1–0 loss to Lupa Roma.

On 20 July 2018, he joined Serie B club Salernitana on a three-year contract with an option for a fourth, after previously playing on them on loan.

On 30 July 2019, he joined Sambenedettese on loan.

On 30 September 2020, he was loaned to Serie C club Juve Stabia.

On 2 August 2021, he joined Serie B side Alessandria on loan for the season.

On 9 January 2023, Orlando moved on loan to Siena.

References

External links
 

1995 births
Sportspeople from Taranto
Footballers from Apulia
Living people
Italian footballers
Serie B players
Serie C players
L.R. Vicenza players
U.S. Salernitana 1919 players
A.S. Sambenedettese players
S.S. Juve Stabia players
U.S. Alessandria Calcio 1912 players
A.C.N. Siena 1904 players
Association football forwards